On 5 July 2005, five terrorists attacked the makeshift Ram temple at the site of destroyed Babri Mosque in Ayodhya, India. All five were shot dead in the ensuing gunfight with the Central Reserve Police Force (CRPF), while one civilian died in the grenade attack that the attackers launched in order to breach the cordoned wall. The CRPF suffered three casualties, two of whom were seriously injured with multiple gunshot wounds.

Attack 
Following the demolition of the Babri Masjid in 1992, a makeshift temple had been constructed at the Ram Janmabhoomi site, in the city of Ayodhya. According to Hinduism the site was the birthplace of Hindu deity King Rama. On 5 July 2005, the heavily guarded Ram Janmabhoomi - Babri Masjid complex was attacked by heavily armed terrorists. The attack was foiled by security officials and the attackers were killed.

The terrorists were from the Islamist terrorist organisation Lashkar-e-Taiba, and were believed to have entered India through Nepal. They posed as pilgrims on their way to Ayodhya, and boarded a Tata Sumo at Akbarpur near the Kichaucha village in Faizabad. At Faizabad they abandoned the Sumo and hired a jeep driven by a driver, Rehan Alam Ansari. According to a statement by the driver, the terrorists visited the Ram (Temple) at Ayodhya where they prayed, possibly to reinforce the impression that they were indeed pilgrims. The terrorists then drove the jeep into the Ram Janmabhoomi site, and forced the driver out of the vehicle, banging the jeep against the security cordon. At 9:05 am, they hurled M67 grenades from 50 metres away to breach the cordon fence. Ramesh Pandey, a pilgrim guide who happened to be near the site at this moment, died on the spot as a result of the grenade blast. Firing indiscriminately, the 5 terrorists entered the Mata Sita Rasoi. Returning the gunfire, a platoon of 35 CRPF soldiers killed all five of the terrorists in a gunfight that lasted for over an hour. Three CRPF soldiers also received serious injuries and, as of July 2008, two remain comatose. All the terrorists died within 100 metres of the site.

Investigation 
The assailants were suspected to belong to the Islamic terrorist group Lashkar-e-Taiba. The investigating team tracked the phone calls made from the cell phones carried by the terrorists using the IMEI numbers. The Police recovered a single RPG-7 rocket-propelled grenade launcher, five Type 56 assault rifles, five M1911 pistols, several M67 grenades and some jihadi documents. Rehan Alam, the jeep driver, was detained by the police for further investigations.

On 28 July 2005, four Muslim men from Jammu and Kashmir – Akbar Hussain, Lal Mohammad, Mohmmad Naseer and Mohmmad Rafeeq – were arrested in connection with the attack. On 3 August 2005, another four Muslim men– Asif Iqbal, Mohammed Aziz, Mohammed Nasim and Shaqeel Ahmed– were arrested on suspicion of involvement in the bombing. A fifth man, Irfan Khan, was arrested a few days earlier.

Aftermath 
Most of India's political organisations condemned the attack as barbaric and requested people to maintain law and order. The Rashtriya Swayamsevak Sangh, its affiliates the Vishva Hindu Parishad and the Bharatiya Janata Party (BJP) declared an India-wide protest and bandh on 8 July 2005. BJP president L.K. Advani called for the reinstatement of the Prevention of Terrorist Activities Act in the wake of the attack.

See also
Terrorism in India

References

External links 
6 militants storm Ayodhya, killed (rediff.com).
Terrorists attack the fountainhead of faith (Times of India).
Police get lead into Ayodhya attack (rediff.com).
Ayodhya coverage (rediff.com).
Ram Temple Turmoil  (Indian Express).
Indian Express coverage
Times Of India coverage

Terrorist incidents in India in 2005
Ayodhya
Mass shootings in India
Mass murder in 2005
Ram Janmabhoomi attack in Ayodhya
Attacks on religious buildings and structures in India
Massacres in religious buildings and structures
Terrorist incidents in Uttar Pradesh
July 2005 events in India
2005 mass shootings in Asia
2005 murders in India